Ottó Török (born 1 November 1937) is a Hungarian former modern pentathlete. He competed at the 1964 Summer Olympics winning a bronze medal in the team event.

References

1937 births
Living people
Hungarian male modern pentathletes
Olympic modern pentathletes of Hungary
Modern pentathletes at the 1964 Summer Olympics
Olympic bronze medalists for Hungary
Olympic medalists in modern pentathlon
Sportspeople from Budapest
Medalists at the 1964 Summer Olympics
20th-century Hungarian people
21st-century Hungarian people